Leonard Pope (born September 10, 1983) is a former American football tight end. He was drafted by the Arizona Cardinals in the third round of the 2006 NFL Draft. He played college football at Georgia.

Pope has also played for the Kansas City Chiefs, Pittsburgh Steelers, and the Chicago Bears.

Professional career

Arizona Cardinals
After emerging as a redzone target in 2007 with five touchdown catches, in 2008 Pope had nine catches total (none for a touchdown).

The Cardinals waived Pope on September 4, 2009.

Kansas City Chiefs
Pope signed with the Kansas City Chiefs on September 29, 2009. Pope scored four touchdowns during his three seasons with the Chiefs. In 2011, he started ten games, setting career highs in receptions and yards, and tying his career high in average yards per catch. One of his notable plays was during the 2011 Chiefs/Packers game where the Chiefs upset the previously undefeated Packers 19-14. Pope attempted to catch the ball, was tackled and possibly fumbled the ball before he had gone out of bounds. The play was reviewed, and the referees said it was a catch.

Pittsburgh Steelers
Pope signed a one-year contract with the Pittsburgh Steelers on April 10, 2012, reuniting him with his former Cardinals and Chiefs coach Todd Haley, who was the Steelers offensive coordinator.

Chicago Bears
On August 3, 2013, Pope was signed by the Chicago Bears. He was released on August 25.

Personal life
Pope has four brothers, four sisters, two daughters (Cheryan and Laila Pope), and two sons (Leonard Pope IV and Lucas Rylan Pope). He attended Americus High School in Americus, Georgia.

Pope saved 6-year-old Bryson Moore from drowning in June 2011.

Pope's nickname is "Champ", and he has a charity foundation also called CHAMP (Creating Hope And Making Progress) to help under-privileged children.

References

External links
Kansas City Chiefs bio

1983 births
Living people
People from Americus, Georgia
Players of American football from Georgia (U.S. state)
American football tight ends
Georgia Bulldogs football players
Arizona Cardinals players
Kansas City Chiefs players
Pittsburgh Steelers players
Chicago Bears players